Quadream is an Israeli surveillance technology company.  It was founded in 2014 by a group including two former NSO Group employees, Guy Geva and Nimrod Reznik. Its offices are in Ramat Gan.

Quadream is believed to have developed "zero-click" exploit tools similar to those used by NSO Group. Its customers include the government of Saudi Arabia.

References 

Companies of Israel
Security companies of Israel
Spyware companies